Personal Jukebox is a compilation album by the Italian singer-songwriter Alice, released in 2000 on WEA/Warner Music.

In spring 2000, Alice returned to the Sanremo music festival, nineteen years after the victory with "Per Elisa". The song she performed, Juri Camisasca's "Il giorno dell'indipendenza" ("The Day of Independence"), was also the opening track on the career retrospective Personal Jukebox, alongside two other new recordings, "Tutto è niente" ("All Is Nothing") and an Italian language cover version of David Bowie/Pat Metheny Group's "This is Not America" with new lyrics by the singer herself.

Personal Jukebox also contains four singles from Alice's then most recent pop albums Exit (1998) and Charade (1995), the original versions of "In viaggio sul tuo viso" from Mezzogiorno sulle Alpi (1992) and "Visioni" from Il sole nella pioggia (1989) licensed from EMI, as well as new interpretations of some of her best-known songs from the 1980s, among them "Chan-son Egocentrique" (a duet with Italian alternative rock band Bluvertigo), "Prospettiva Nevski", "A Cosa Pensano", "Nomadi", "Il vento caldo dell'estate", a technofied take on "Per Elisa" and an orchestral solo version of "I treni di Tozeur".

Track listing
"Il giorno dell'indipendenza" (Juri Camisasca) – 3:44
 Previously unreleased
"For This Is Not America" (Italian version of "This Is Not America") (David Bowie, Pat Metheny, Alice) – 3:57
 Previously unreleased
"Tutto è niente" (Alice) – 3:34
 Previously unreleased
"Open Your Eyes" (duet with Skye of Morcheeba) (Juri Camisasca, Peter Hammill, Alice, Francesco Messina) – 4:08
 From 1998 album Exit
"Dimmi di sì" (Alice) – 4:10
 From 1998 album Exit
"Dammi la mano amore" (Remix) (with Trey Gunn) (Alice) – 3:51
 From 1995 album Charade
"Chanson Egocentrique" (2000 version – duet with Bluvertigo) (Franco Battiato, Francesco Messina, Tommaso Tramonti) – 3:52
 Original duet version with Franco Battiato appears on 1982 album Azimut
"In viaggio sul tuo viso" (Francesco Messina, Alice) – 4:06
Includes "Istenem Istenem" (Traditional, arranged by Francesco Messina, Alice)
 From 1992 album Mezzogiorno Sulle Alpi
"Prospettiva Nevski" (Franco Battiato, Giusto Pio) – 3:50
 Original version appears on 1985 album Gioielli rubati
"A cosa pensano" (Alice, Francesco Messina) – 3:10
 Original version appears on 1982 album Azimut
"Per Elisa" (Franco Battiato, Giusto Pio, Alice) – 3:58
 Original version appears on 1981 album Alice a.k.a. Per Elisa
"Nomadi" (Juri Camisasca) – 3:55
 Original version appears on 1986 album Park Hotel
"Visioni" (Juri Camisasca) – 4:27
 From 1989 album Il sole nella pioggia
"Non ero mai sola" (with Trey Gunn) (Francesco Messina, Alice) – 4:23
 From 1995 album Charade
"I treni di Tozeur" (Franco Battiato, Giusto Pio, Saro Cosentino) – 2:44
 Original duet version with Franco Battiato released as single in 1984. Alternate solo version appears on 1987 album Elisir
"Il vento caldo dell'estate" (2000 version) (Franco Battiato, Giusto Pio, Francesco Messina, Alice) – 4:34
 Original version appears on 1980 album Capo Nord. Alternate version appears on 1987 album Elisir

Personnel
 Alice – lead vocals, keyboards tracks 6, 9, 14
 London Session Orchestra with Gavyn Wright – strings tracks 1–3, 9 & 15
 Pino Pinaxa Pischetola – rhythm tracks 1–6, 10–12, 14 & 16, overdubs & remix track 6, computer programming track 8
 Marco Guarnerio – keyboards & guitars tracks 1–3, 8, 10 & 12, keyboards track 4, 5, 9, 15, guitars tracks 6 & 14, keyboards and programming track 13, acoustic guitar, additional keyboards, piano track 16
 Francesco Messina – keyboards tracks 1–6, 8, 10, 11, 13 & 16, piano tracks 6 & 14 keyboards & programming tracks 9 & 12, additional keyboards track 15
 Skye Edwards of Morcheeba – vocals track 4
 Mauro Spina – additional percussion track 6
 Trey Gunn – Warr, stick guitar tracks 6 & 14
 Stuart Gordon – electric violin track 6, MIDI violin track 14
 Morgan of Bluvertigo – vocals, Wurlitzer, bass guitar track 7
 Andy of Bluvertigo – vocals, nord lead, saxophone, bass track 7
 Sergio of Bluvertigo – drums, tambourine track 7
 Livio of Bluvertigo – guitars track 7
 Mauro Pagani – flute, percussion track 7
 Gavin Harrison – drums track 8
 Paolo Fresu – trumpet track 8
 Roberto Baldi – keyboards track 11
 Steve Jansen – rhythm track 13
 Stefano Cerri – bass track 13
 Richard Barbieri – keyboards, programming track 13
 Jon Hassell – keyboard activated sound track 13
 Dave Gregory – guitar track 13
 Marco Liverani – keyboards track 13

Production
 Francesco Messina – producer
 Tracks 1, 2, 3, 9, 10, 11, 12, 15 & 16 recorded and mixed by Pino Pinaxa Pischetola at Stonehenge Studios & Didde Studios, Milan 2000
 Tracks 1, 2, 3 & 9 strings arranged and conducted by Will Malone, recorded at Angel Recording Studios, London by Gary Thomas
 Track 15 strings arranged and conducted by Alberto Tafuri, recorded at Angel Recording Studios, London by Gary Thomas
 Morgan of Bluvertigo – producer track 7
 Roberto Baldi – additional production track 11
 Marco Guarnieri – additional production track 12
 Gianni Versari – mastering Nautilus, Milan, February 2000
 Sheila Rock – photography
 Polystudio – cover design
 Massimo Gradone & the Polystudio archives – photography booklet
 Una Sas, Bologna – executive producers

External links

2000 greatest hits albums
Alice (singer) albums
Italian-language compilation albums